Avanhard is a Ukrainian form of avant-garde. In Ukraine it is associated often with a sports society of the Soviet period (Avanhard).

It may refer to:

 Avanhard, Odessa Oblast, an urban locality in Odessa Oblast, Ukraine
 Avanhard (Vorokhta), a ski resort and sports base in the Vorokhta, Ukraine
 Avanhard (sports society), a trade unions sports society
 Avanhard Stadium (disambiguation)
 Avanhard, a Russian Hypersonic Glide Vehicle